William Greenough may refer to:
 William T. Greenough (1944–2013), professor of psychology
 William B. Greenough III (born 1932), American physician